Across a Wire: Live in New York City (also known as Across a Wire: Live in New York for short) is the third album released by American rock band Counting Crows, released on July 14, 1998. It is a double-live album, featuring songs from their first two albums, August and Everything After (1993) and Recovering the Satellites (1996). Because the album contained two discs, the release was certified platinum by the RIAA for shipments of over 500,000 copies.

The first disc, recorded for VH1 Storytellers, is acoustic and intimate; it also contains a previously unreleased hidden track, "Chelsea". The second disc, recorded for MTV's Live from the 10 Spot show, is rocky and direct.

The cover art for the album, featuring electrical poles with the Statue of Liberty in the background, is taken from a 1967 photograph by David Plowden entitled "Statue of Liberty from Caven Point Road, Jersey City, New Jersey."

Track listing
All tracks written by Adam Duritz unless otherwise indicated.

Disc one
"Round Here" (Duritz, Dave Janusko, Dan Jewett, Chris Roldan, David Bryson) – 6:16
"Have You Seen Me Lately?" – 3:57
"Angels of the Silences" (Duritz, Charles Gillingham) – 3:57
"Catapult" (Duritz, Malley, Vickrey, Mize, Bryson, Gillingham) – 3:57
"Mr. Jones" (Duritz, Bryson) – 5:17
"Rain King" (Duritz, Bryson) – 5:51
"Mercury" – 3:45
"Ghost Train" – 5:27
"Anna Begins" (Duritz, Bryson, Marty Jones, Toby Hawkins, Lydia Holly) – 13:54
"Chelsea" (Duritz, Bryson, Gillingham, Malley) – 6:15

Disc two
"Recovering the Satellites" – 5:49
"Angels of the Silences" (Duritz, Gillingham) – 3:34
"Rain King" (Duritz, Bryson) – 5:48
"Sullivan Street" (Duritz, Bryson) – 4:37
"Children in Bloom" – 5:19
"Have You Seen Me Lately?" – 4:10
"Raining in Baltimore" – 5:34
"Round Here" (Duritz, Janusko, Jewett, Roldan, Bryson) – 10:00
"I'm Not Sleeping" – 4:58
"A Murder of One" (Duritz, Bryson, Malley) –– 5:35
"A Long December" – 6:06
"Walkaways" (Duritz, Dan Vickrey) – 1:50

Chart performance

Certifications

References

External links

1998 live albums
Counting Crows live albums
Geffen Records live albums
Albums recorded at the Hammerstein Ballroom
VH1 Storytellers